This is the list of universities and colleges in Hisar, previously spelled Hissar, in Hisar district in the state of Haryana in northwestern India.

Universities in Hisar
 Chaudhary Charan Singh Haryana Agricultural University
 Guru Jambheshwar University of Science and Technology, established in 1995.
 Lala Lajpat Rai University of Veterinary & Animal Sciences, established in 2010.
 Om Sterling Global University, private university.
 Haryana Institute of Civil Aviation, Hisar Airport.

Research Institutes

National Research Institutes
 Central Sheep Breeding Farm 
 Central Institute for Research on Buffaloes (CIRB)
 National Research Centre on Equines
 National Research Centre on Plant Biotechnology, Hisar offers MTech in Plant Biotechnology

State Research Institutes
 Government Livestock Farm, Hisar 
 Haryana Space Applications Centre, Hisar (HARSAC), offers MTech in Gio-Informatics 
 Indo-Israeli Centre of Excellence for Animal Husbandary & Dairying, Hisar at Government Livestock Farm, Hisar 
 Northern Region Farm Machinery Training and Testing Institute 
 Regional Fodder Station, Hisar

Colleges in Hisar

As of December 2019, there are 31 government degree colleges in Hisar district, 10 government and 21 private.

Degree colleges (govt)
There are 10 government degree colleges in Hisar district (c. December 2019).
 Government College, Adampur
 Government College, Barwala
 Government College, Data, establishment announced in fy2018–19
 Nehru Memorial Government College, Hansi
 Govt. Post Graduate College, Hisar
 Govt. College for Girls, Hisar
 Government College, Kheri Chaupta, establishment announced in 2018–19
 Government College, Nalwa
 Government College, Narnaund
 Government College Uklana, establishment announced in 2018–19

Degree colleges (private)
There are 21 private degree colleges in Hisar district (c. December 2019). Some of the oldest colleges are
 Akash Education Society
 CRM JAT College
 Chhaju Ram Law College, Hisar
 Chhaju Ram College of Education, Hisar
 Dayanand college
 Fateh Chand College for Women (Lahore), Hisar 
 Imperial PG College
 Maharani Lakshmi Bai Post Graduate College, Bhiwani Rohilla, Hisar
 Manav Institute of Education, Hisar
 Mata Jiyo Devi College of Education, Khanda Kheri
 Shanti Niketan Vidyapeeth, Hisar

Degree college (sanskrit)
 Dayanand Brahm Mahavidyala, Hisar

Engineering and technology
 Engineering
 Kalpana Chawla Institute of Engineering and Technology Chikanwas, Hisar
 OM Institute of OM Institute of Technology and Management, Hisar
 Manav Institute of Technology and Management, Jeora
 Prannath Parnami Institute of Management & Technology ,Hisar
 Shanti Niketan Vidyapeeth, Hisar
 Shree Balaji Institute of Technology, Hisar
 Saraswati Institute of Technology, Hisar
 Vishwakarma Government College Of Engineering, Hisar

 Polytechnic college
 Government Polytechnic, Hisar
 Government Polytechnic Adampur
 Shanti Niketan Vidyapeeth, Hisar

Medical
 Maharaja Agrasen Medical College, Agroha, MBBS, MS and MD

Nursing
 Indus College of Nursing, Khanda Kheri
 Maharaja Agrasen Medical College, Agroha: offers GNM
 Savitri Devi Jindal Institute of Nursing, Hisar

Paramedical
 AYUSH
 National College of Ayurveda & Hospital  Barwala Hisar Haryana 125121

 BioTechnology
 CCS Haryana Agricultural University: Department of Biochemistry offers PhD
 Guru Jambheshwar University of Science and Technology: offers Masters in BioTech

 Homoeopathy
 Haryana Medical Institute, Hisar

Pharmacy
 Government Polytechnic Adampur
 Guru Jambheshwar University of Science and Technology: Faculty of Pharmaceutical Sciences offers MPhrama and BPharma
 Manav Group's Institute of Pharmacy: offers BPharma and DPharma
 Rajendra Institutes of Technology & Sciences: Technology: offers MPhrama and BPharma

Physiotherapy
 Guru Jambheshwar University of Science and Technology: Department of Physiotherapy offers Bachelors and master's degree
 Maharaja Agrasen Medical College, Agroha, Bachelors and master's degree

See also

 List of schools in Hisar
 List of institutions of higher education in Haryana

References

Hisar
Hisar
 
Haryana-related lists